Saint-Raphaël Var Handball, is a team handball club from Saint-Raphaël, Var, France, that plays in the LNH Division 1.
Saint-Raphaël Var handball, or SRVHB, is a French handball club based in Saint-Raphael in the Var region, founded in 1963. The first team has been playing in Division 1 since the 2007–2008 season and has been coached since 2019 by Rareș Fortuneanu assisted by Wissem Hmam, both former players of the club.
  
Even if the club has not won a title apart of the French D2 Championship in 2007, it has accumulated places of honor including a French runner-up title in 2016, three League Cup finals, a Champions Trophy final in 2015 and an EHF European Cup (C3) final in 2018.

History 
The original club was founded in 1959. It was after the disaster of the Malpasset dam in Frejus on 2 December 1959 that the leaders of the two cities merged the volleyball sections of the football clubs of the two cities, the Etoile Sportive Fréjussienne and the Stade Raphaélois to create the Association Sportive Fréjus Saint-Raphaël, commonly known as ASFSR. It was in 1963, at the initiative of René Cenni, that the handball section was born. Marcel Tafani was then appointed president of the section.

In 1971, the handball section created a women's team and found a home in a sports hall inaugurated on 7 November 1972 during a match against Draguignan: the Esterel sports hall. In 1974, the town of Fréjus created the AMSLF. The Raphael section, freshly promoted to National 3, was destabilized by the loss of many elements and went down to the regional championship the following year. Three years later, in 1977, the club lost its inter-municipal status. It lost its "F" and became A. S. S. R. for Association Sportive Saint-Raphaël. Over time, the club grew and evolved. It reached the National 3 level in 1983, National 2 in 1992 and National 1 in 1994.

In 1995, the section separated from the communal club and the club was created under the name Saint-Raphaël Var Handball. The club finally reached the elite in 2004 but was relegated the following season to D2. The Palais des sports Jean-François-Krakowski was inaugurated in 2005 during a gala match against Chambéry. The club returned to the LNH two years later, in 2007, after winning the D2 championship.

Since his return in elite, coach Christian Gaudin has made the club one of the best in France, finishing 4th in 2010 and 2011 and 3rd in 2012. The club also reached the League Cup final three times (2010, 2012 and 2014), losing three times to Montpellier AHB. On March 18, 2014, the club's president announced, a year in advance, the end of Christian Gaudin's contract. 
He was replaced by Joël da Silva, from Toulouse, who allowed the club to reach a new level by returning to 3rd place in 2015 and becoming vice-champion of France in 2016. Under his orders, the club also reached the final of the EHF European Cup in 2018.
With his contract set to expire in June 2019, Joel Da Silva has been replaced by his assistant Rareș Fortuneanu as coach. The former Romanian international, who played for Saint-Raphaël, has been assistant coach for the last 4 seasons. His assistant, Wissem Hmam also knew the SRVHB as a player.

In October 2020, Jean-François Krakowski decided to retire after 33 years at the head of the club and was replaced by Emmanuel Murzereau.

Prize list 
{| class="wikitable" style="font-size: 95%; margin:auto;"
|- style="color:#ffffff; background:#022662; text-align:center;"
| width="50%" | ‘National competitions'''
| width="50%" | ‘International competitions|-
|valign="top"|
 France championship (0) Vice-champion (1) : 2016.
 Third : 2012, 2015.
 French Cup (0)Semi-finalist : 1996 and 2003.
 League's Cup (0)Finalist : 2010, 2012 and 2014.
 Champions Trophy (0) Finalist : 2015, 2018.
 French D2 Championship (1)Champion : 2007.

|valign="top"| 
 EHF Cup(C3) (0) Finalist : 2018.
 Fourth : 2017.
|}

 Season by season review (from 2001) 

 European record 

 Evolution of the SRVHB budget 

 Current squad 

 Squad of 2022-2023 season 

Goalkeepers
 1  Vincent Gérard
 16  Mickaël Robin
Wingers
LW
 20  Raphaël Caucheteux
 97  Drevy Paschal
RW
 10  Martial Caïs
 24  Arthur Vigneron

Line players
 8  Jonathan Mapu
 36  Johannes Marescot

Back players
LB
 15  Nik Henigman
 17  Benjamin Bataille
CB
 5  Mihailo Vojinovic
 9  Chema Márquez
 28  Sergio Pérez Manzanares
RB
 19  Benjamin Hallgren
 32  Adrien Dipanda (c)

 Transfers
Transfers for the 2023–24 season

Joining

Leaving

  Vincent Gérard (GK) (to  THW Kiel)

 Club-related players 

In  'bold' , players currently at the club.
  Aurélien Abily : from 2009 to 2018.
  Arnór Atlason : from 2013 to 2016.
  Xavier Barachet : from 2013 to 2014 since 2017.
  Johan Boisedu : from 2007 to 2010.
  Raphaël Caucheteux : since 2007.
  Adrien Dipanda : since 2012.
  Slaviša Đukanović : from 2007 to 2017.
  Dan Rares Fortuneanu : from 2004 to 2013.
  Christian Gaudin : from 2003 to 2006.
  Wissem Hmam : from 2014 to 2018.
  David Juříček : from 2011 to 2013.
  Miroslav Jurka : from 2013 to 2019.

  Nicolas Krakowski : from 2007 to 2021.
  Geoffroy Krantz : from 2011 to 2018.
  Alexander Lynggaard : from 2013 to 2020.
  Heykel Megannem : from 2009 to March 2013.
  Nicolas Moretti : from 2007 to 2013.
  Morten Olsen : from 2013 to 2015.
  Yohann Ploquin : from 2009 to 2013.
  Mihai Popescu : since 2016.
  Daniel Sarmiento Melián : since 2016.
  Alexandru Șimicu : since 2015.
  Jan Stehlík : from 2009 to 2017.
  Arthur Vigneron : since 2012.

 Individual distinctions 

 Top scorers in the history of SRVHB in the league 
In  'bold' , players currently at the club.

- ‘'updated on April 30, 2020 -

 Other personalities linked to the club 
In  'bold' '', players currently at the club.

 Coaches 
  Željko Anić : coach from ? to 2004.
  Rudy Bertsch : coach from 2004 to 2005.
  Christian Gaudin : coach from 2005 to 2014.
  Joël da Silva : coach from 2014 to 2019, assisted by Rareș Fortuneanu.
  Rareș Fortuneanu : coach since 2019, assisted by Wissem Hmam.

 List of presidents 
 Marcel Tafani : 1963-1965
 Jacky Soler : 1965-1974 then 1976-1977
 Alain Sanchez : 1974-1976
 Maurice Odin : 1977-1984
 Guy Rivard : 1984-1987 
 Jean-François Krakowski : 1987-2020
 Emmanuel Murzereau : since October 2020

 Organigram of SRVHB Saint-Raphaël Var Handball (SAOS)Director's officeChairman of the board : Emmanuel Murzereau
Board of directors : Emmanuel Murzereau, Jean-Pierre Gaspari, Frédéric Tibéri, Alain Bessou and Pascal Bacchi
General Manager : Émeric Paillasson
Supervisory Board (12 members), chaired by Jean-François SaulayTechnical staffCoach : Rareș Fortuneanu
Assistant coach : Wissem Hmam
Sports manager of the formation center : Romain Conte
Logistics manager : Pierre LuhernMedical staffClub doctor : Dr Michel Ducasse
Physiotherapist : Thomas Montagnon and Mickaël Joulin Association (Saint-Raphaël Var Handball Association)
President : André Gongora
Communication manager : Valentine Dumont-MussoPermanents members of the structure'''
Administrative manager : Patricia Garcia-Gaspari
Communication / Press Manager : Kelly Texier
Marketing Manager / Club of Partners : Adrien Protais

Gallery

Players

External links

French handball clubs
Sport in Var (department)